Maiorino is a surname. Notable people with the surname include:

 Alessandra Maiorino (born 1974), Italian politician
 Eduardo Maiorino (1979–2012), Brazilian kickboxer and martial artist
 Pasquale Maiorino (born 1989), Italian footballer

See also
 Maiolino